Anthony Jude Pero (October 14, 1959 – March 20, 2015) was an American drummer, in American heavy metal bands Twisted Sister and Adrenaline Mob.

Biography
Pero went to St. Peter's Boys High School in Staten Island but left because the faculty made him cut his hair. He then went to New Dorp High School and graduated in 1977. He was initially a jazz drummer, later gravitating to heavier music akin to Rush and Led Zeppelin. Pero worked as a taxi driver for a time, and joined Cities, a local New York City band. He joined Twisted Sister in April 1982, after seeing them play at a club and being told they were in need of a drummer. Upon his departure from Twisted Sister in July 1986, he re-joined Cities. He participated in the band's 1997 reunion and continued to perform with Twisted Sister until his death. He was also a member of the Ozzy Osbourne cover band, No More Tears, which was well known around Staten Island, New York.

In 2007, Pero formed Circle Of Thorns with former Cities guitarist Steve Mironovich aka Steve Irons. In 2011, Pero played drums on a song titled "Elephant Man" on the Eric Carr CD Unfinished Business.
On December 3, 2013, Pero was announced as the new drummer of the band Adrenaline Mob.

Death
On March 20, 2015, Adrenaline Mob's band members and crew attempted but failed to wake Pero on their tour bus. The band was traveling from Baltimore to Poughkeepsie. Pero was taken to a hospital where he was declared dead from an apparent heart attack. In 2017, the band released their third studio album, We the People, containing Pero's last recording: a cover of Billy Idol's "Rebel Yell".

References

External links

1959 births
2015 deaths
Twisted Sister members
American heavy metal drummers
People from Staten Island
Musicians from New York City
Adrenaline Mob members
American taxi drivers
New Dorp High School alumni
American people of Italian descent
St. Peter's Boys High School alumni